

Incumbents

Federal government
President: João Goulart (until 1 April), Ranieri Mazzilli (from 1 April to 15 April), Marshal Castelo Branco (from 15 April)
Minister of War: Dantas Ribeiro until April 4, Artur da Costa e Silva
Minister of Mines and Energy: Oliveira Brito until April 4, Artur da Costa e Silva until April 17, Mauro Thibau

Governors 
 Acre: vacant
 Alagoas: Luis Cavalcante 
 Amazonas: Plínio Ramos Coelho (until 27 June); Artur César Ferreira Reis (from 27 June)
 Bahia: Lomanto Júnior  
 Ceará: Virgilio Távora
 Espírito Santo: Francisco Lacerda de Aguiar 
 Goiás: Mauro Borges (until 26 November); Carlos de Meira Mattos (from 26 November)
 Guanabara: Carlos Lacerda
 Maranhão: Newton de Barros Belo 
 Mato Grosso: Fernando Corrêa da Costa 
 Minas Gerais: José de Magalhães Pinto  
 Pará: Aurélio do Carmo (until 15 June); Jarbas Passarinho (from 15 June)
 Paraíba: Pedro Gondim 
 Paraná: Nei Braga 
 Pernambuco: Miguel Arraes (until 2 April); Paulo Pessoa Guerra (from 2 April)
 Piauí: Petrônio Portella
 Rio de Janeiro: 
 until 1 May: Badger da Silveira
 1 May-4 May: Cordolino Ambrósio
 from 4 May: Pablo Torres                                                                            
 Rio Grande do Norte: Aluízio Alves 
 Rio Grande do Sul: Ildo Meneghetti 
 Santa Catarina: Celso Ramos 
 São Paulo: Ademar de Barros 
 Sergipe: João de Seixas Dória (until 2 April); Sebastião Celso de Carvalho (from 2 April)

Vice governors
 Alagoas: Teotônio Brandão Vilela 
 Bahia: Orlando Moscoso 
 Ceará: Joaquim de Figueiredo Correia 
 Espírito Santo: Rubens Rangel 
 Goiás: vacant
 Maranhão: Alfredo Salim Duailibe 
 Mato Grosso: Jose Garcia Neto 
 Minas Gerais: Clóvis Salgado da Gama 
 Pará: Newton Burlamaqui de Miranda (until 9 June); Agostinho de Meneses de Monteiro (from 15 June)
 Paraíba: André Avelino de Paiva Gadelha 
 Paraná: Afonso Alves de Camargo Neto (from 20 March)
 Pernambuco: Paulo Pessoa Guerra (until 2 April); vacant thereafter (from 2 April)
 Piauí: João Clímaco d'Almeida 
 Rio de Janeiro: 
 until 1 May: João Batista da Costa
 1 May-4 May: vacant thereafter
 from 4 May: Teotônio Araújo
 Rio Grande do Norte: Teodorico Bezerra 
 Santa Catarina: Armindo Marcílio Doutel de Andrade
 São Paulo: Laudo Natel 
 Sergipe: Celso Carvalho (until 1 April); vacant thereafter (from 1 April)

Events
 13 March – A speech by President João Goulart announces significant political reforms, including nationalisation and social justice programs.
 19 March – March of the Family with God for Liberty
 31 March to 1 April – 1964 Brazilian coup d'état
 11 April – The country holds its first indirect elections after the coup. Castelo Branco is elected the next president.
 13 May – Brazil terminates its diplomatic relations with Cuba. They would only be resumed after the end of the military regime.

Births
January 11 – Patrícia Pillar, actress
January 18 – Gustavo Bebianno, lawyer and politician (d. 2020)
January 20 – Márcia Cabrita, actress (died 2017)
April 18 – Lourenço Mutarelli, underground comic book writer
April 21 – Anna Muylaert, television and film director
May 23 – Beto Brant, filmmaker
July 10 – Dalton Vigh, actor
September 11
 Alexandre Lippiani, actor and voice actor (d. 1997)
 Damares Alves, Minister of Human Rights, Family and Women
 October 26 – Irving São Paulo, Brazilian actor (d. 2006)
 November 20 – Leonardo Medeiros, Brazilian actor 
 December 7 – Roberta Close, transgender model

Deaths
February 9 – Ary Barroso, composer, pianist, songwriter, soccer commentator, and talent-show host
November 6 – Anita Malfatti, artist

References

See also 
1964 in Brazilian football
List of Brazilian films of 1964

 
1960s in Brazil
Years of the 20th century in Brazil
Brazil
Brazil